Lục Vân Tiên is a 2002 Vietnamese TV film directed by Phương Điền based on a Lục Vân Tiên, a 19th-century epic poem.

The Romeo and Juliet story stars actress Hà Kiều Anh as Kiều Nguyệt Nga. Some of the scenes in a bathing spring created a small scandal in Vietnam.

The show was also shown on the ImaginAsian network in the United States.

References

External links
ImaginAsian page

2002 films
Vietnamese historical films